Father Divine (September 10, 1965), also known as Reverend M. J. Divine, was an American spiritual leader from about 1907 until his death in 1965. His full self-given name was Reverend Major Jealous Divine, and he was also known as "the Messenger" early in his life. He founded the International Peace Mission movement, formed its doctrine and oversaw its growth from a small and predominantly black congregation into a multiracial and international church. Due to his ideology, many consider him to be a cult leader.

Father Divine claimed to be God. He made numerous contributions toward his followers' economic independence and racial equality. He was a contemporary of other religious leaders such as Daddy Grace, Charles Harrison Mason, Noble Drew Ali, James F. Jones (also known as Prophet Jones), Wallace Fard Muhammad, Elijah Muhammad and Jim Jones.

Life and career

Prior to 1912: Early life and original name
Little is known about Father Divine's early life, or even his real given name. Father Divine and the peace movement he started did not keep many records. Father Divine declined several offers to write his biography, saying that "the history of God would not be useful in mortal terms". He also refused to acknowledge relationship to any family. Newspapers in the 1930s had to dig up his probable given name: George Baker. This name is not recognized by the Library of Congress, and from 1979, there is no further use of that name as a heading for Father Divine in libraries' catalogs.

Federal Bureau of Investigation files record his name as George Baker alias "God". In 1936 Eliza Mayfield claimed to be Father Divine's mother. She stated that his real name was Frederick Edwards from Hendersonville, North Carolina, and he had abandoned a wife and five children, but Mayfield offered no proof and claimed to not remember his father's name. Father Divine replied that "God has no mother."

Father Divine's childhood remains a contentious point. Some, especially earlier researchers, suppose that he was born in the Deep South, most likely in Georgia, as the son of sharecroppers. Newer research by Jill Watts, based on census data, finds evidence for a George Baker Jr. of appropriate age born in an African-American enclave of Rockville, Maryland, called Monkey Run. If this theory is correct, his mother was a former slave named Nancy Baker, who died in May 1897.

Most researchers agree that Father Divine's parents were freed black slaves. Notoriously poor records were kept about this generation of African Americans, so controversy about his upbringing is not likely to be resolved. On the other hand, he and his first wife, Peninniah (variant spellings: Penninah, Peninnah, Penniah) claimed that they were married on June 6, 1882.

Father Divine was probably called George Baker around the turn of the century. He worked as a gardener in Baltimore, Maryland. In a 1906 trip to California, Father Divine became acquainted with the ideas of Charles Fillmore and the New Thought movement, a philosophy of positive thinking that would inform his later doctrines. Among other things, this belief system asserted that negative thoughts led to poverty and unhappiness. Songwriter Johnny Mercer credited a Father Divine sermon for inspiring the title of his song "Ac-Cent-Tchu-Ate the Positive".

Father Divine attended a local Baptist Church, often preaching, until 1907, when a traveling preacher named Samuel Morris spoke and was expelled from the congregation. Morris, originally from Allegheny County, Pennsylvania, had a soft-spoken and uncontroversial sermon until the end, when he raised his arms and shouted "I am the Eternal Father!" This routine had him thrown out of many churches in Baltimore, and was apparently unsuccessful until Morris happened upon the receptive Father Divine.

In his late 20s, Father Divine became Morris's first follower and adopted a pseudonym, "The Messenger". The Messenger was a Christ figure to Morris's God the Father. Father Divine preached with Morris in Baltimore out of the home of former evangelist Harriette Snowden, who came to accept their divinity. Morris began calling himself "Father Jehovia".

Divine and Father Jehovia were later joined by John A. Hickerson, who called himself Reverend Bishop Saint John the Vine. John the Vine shared the Messenger's excellent speaking ability and his interest in New Thought.

In 1912, the three-man ministry collapsed, as John the Vine denied Father Jehovia's monopoly on godhood, citing 1 John 4:15 to mean God was in everyone:

Father Divine parted ways with his former associates. Denying that Father Jehovia was God, and saying that not everyone could be God, he declared that he himself was God, and the only true expression of God's spirit.

1912–14: In the South
Father Divine traveled south, where he preached extensively in Georgia. In 1913, conflicts with local ministers led to him being sentenced to 60 days in a chain gang. While he was serving his sentence, several prison inspectors were injured in an auto accident, which he viewed as the direct result of their disbelief.

Upon his release, he attracted a following of mostly black women in Valdosta, Georgia. He taught celibacy and the rejection of gender categorizations.

On February 6, 1914, several followers' husbands and local preachers had Divine arrested for lunacy. This arrest expanded his ministry, with reporters and worshipers deluging his prison cell. Some whites even began calling on him.

Former Mercer University professor and lay preacher, J.R. Moseley of Macon, Georgia befriended Divine and arranged for J.B. Copeland, a Mercer alum and respected Valdosta lawyer, to represent him pro bono. Moseley was interested in what he termed "this unusual man" in his autobiography Manifest Destiny."

Decades later, in the 1930s, Moseley met Divine in New York City when he received word that the man going by that name might in fact be the same person he met in Georgia. Father Divine was found mentally sound in spite of "maniacal" beliefs. He had given no name when arrested and was tried as "John Doe (alias God)".

1914–1919: Brooklyn and marriage to Peninniah
In 1914, Father Divine traveled to Brooklyn, New York, with a small number of followers and an all-black congregation. Although he claimed to be God incarnate fulfilling biblical prophecies, he lived relatively quietly.

He and his disciples formed a commune in a black, middle-class apartment building. He forbade sex, alcohol, tobacco and gambling among the people who were living with him. By 1919, he had adopted the name Reverend Major Jealous Divine. "Reverend Major" was chosen as a title of respect and authority, while "Jealous" was a reference to Exodus 34:14, where the Lord says he is a "jealous god" and that God's name is Jealous. His followers affectionately called him Father Divine.

In this period, Father Divine was married to Peninniah (variant spellings: Penninah, Peninnah, Penniah), a follower, who was a few years older than him. Like Father Divine, her early life is obscure, but she is believed to be from Macon, Georgia] The date of the marriage is unknown but probably occurred between 1914 and 1917.

In addition to lending her dignified look to Father Divine, Peninniah served to defuse rumors of impropriety between him and his many young female followers. Both Penninah, who often was called Mother Divine, and Father Divine would assert that the marriage never was physically consummated.

1919–1931: Sayville, New York

Father Divine and his disciples moved to Sayville, New York in 1919. He and his followers were the first black homeowners in town. Father Divine purchased his 72 Macon Street house from a resident who wanted to spite the neighbor he was feuding with. The two neighbors, both German Americans, began fighting when one of them changed his name from Felgenhauer to Fellows in response to anti-German sentiment. His neighbor taunted him, and the feud escalated until Fellows decided to move. As a final insult, he specifically advertised his home for sale to a "colored" buyer, presumably to lower his neighbors' property value.

In this period, his movement underwent sustained growth. Father Divine held free weekly banquets and helped newcomers find jobs. He began attracting many white followers as well as black. The integrated environment of Father Divine's communal house and the apparently flaunted wealth of his Cadillac infuriated neighbors.

Members of the overwhelmingly white community accused him of maintaining a large harem and engaging in scandalous sex, but the district attorney's office in Suffolk County found the claims baseless. To try to please his neighbors, he had a sign posted at his driveway warned guests: NOTICE—Smoking—Intoxicatin g Liquors—Profane Language—Strictly Prohibited. Contrary to the charges of Sayville residents, Angels claimed that Father Divine prohibited singing after 8 p.m., and by 10 p.m. had closed all windows and blinds." Nonetheless, the neighbors continued to complain.

1931–1932: Sayville arrests, trial, notoriety, and prison
On May 8, 1931, a Sayville deputy arrested and charged Father Divine with disturbing the peace. Remarkable during the Depression, Father Divine submitted his $1,000 bail in cash. The trial, not as speedy as the neighbors wanted, was scheduled for late fall, allowing Father Divine's popularity to snowball for the entire Sayville vacation season.

Father Divine held banquets for as many as 3,000 people that summer. Cars clogging the streets for these gatherings bolstered some neighbors' claims that Father Divine was a disturbance to the peace and furthermore was hurting their property values.

On Sunday, November 15, at 12:15 am, a police officer was called to Father Divine's raucously loud property. By the time state troopers, deputies and prison buses were called in, a mob of neighbors had surrounded the compound. Fearing a riot, the police informed Father Divine and his followers that they had fifteen minutes to disperse. Father Divine had them wait in silence for ten minutes, and then they filed into police custody.

Processed by the county jail at 3 am, clerks were frustrated, because his followers often refused to give their usual names and stubbornly offered the "inspired" names they adopted in the movement. Seventy-eight people were arrested altogether, including fifteen whites. Forty-six pleaded guilty to disturbing the peace and incurred $5 fines, which Father Divine paid with a $500 bill, which the court was embarrassingly unable to make change from. Penninah, Father Divine, and 30 followers resisted the charges.

Father Divine's arrest and heterodox doctrines sensationally were reported. The New York frenzy made this event and its repercussions the single most famous moment of Father Divine's life. Although mostly inaccurate, articles on Father Divine propelled his popularity. By December, his followers began renting buildings in New York City for Father Divine to speak in. Soon, he often had several engagements on a single night. On December 20, he spoke to an estimated 10,000 in Harlem's Rockland Palace, a spacious former basketball venue, Manhattan Casino.

By May 1932, meetings were regularly held at the Rockland and throughout New York and New Jersey. Father Divine had supporters in Washington, California and throughout the world thanks to New Thought devotees like Eugene Del Mar, an early convert and former Harlem journalist, and Henry Joerns, the publisher of a New Thought magazine in Seattle. Although the movement was predominantly black, followers outside the Northeastern United States were mostly middle-class whites.

In this period of expansions, several branch communes were opened in New York and New Jersey. Father Divine's followers finally named the movement the International Peace Mission movement.

Father Divine's trial was held on May 24, 1932. His lawyer, Ellee J. Lovelace, a prominent Harlem African American and former US attorney had requested the trial be moved outside of Suffolk County due to potential jury bias. The court acquiesced, and the trial took place at the Nassau County Supreme Court before Justice Lewis J. Smith. After a long trial, with many witnesses, "Justice Smith instructed the jury to ignore the statements made by witnesses not present on the night of the raid. Smith's order invalidated most of the testimony in Father Divine's favor and severely crippled the defense."

The jury found him guilty on June 5 but asked for leniency on behalf of Father Divine. Ignoring the jury's request, Justice Smith lectured on how Father Divine was a fraud and "menace to society" before issuing the maximum sentence for disturbing the peace: one year in prison and a $500 fine.

Smith, 55, died of a heart attack days later on June 9, 1932. Father Divine was widely reported to have commented on the death, "I hated to do it." He wrote to his followers, "I did not desire Judge Smith to die. ... I did desire that MY spirit would touch his heart and change his mind that he might repent and believe and be saved from the grave."

The impression that Justice Smith's death was divine retribution was perpetuated by the press, which failed to report Smith's prior heart problems and implied the death to be more sudden and unexpected than it was.

During his brief prison stay, Father Divine read prodigiously, notably on the Scottsboro Nine. After his attorneys secured release through an appeal on June 25, 1932, he declared that the foundational documents of the United States of America, such as the United States Constitution and Declaration of Independence, were inspired. Father Divine also taught that contemporary leaders strayed from these ideals, but he would become increasingly patriotic through his life.

1932–1942: Harlem

Father Divine moved to Harlem, New York, where he had accumulated a significant following in the black community. Members, rather than Father Divine himself, held most deeds for the movement, but they contributed toward Father Divine's comfortable lifestyle. Purchasing several hotels, which they called "Heavens", members could live and seek jobs inexpensively. He opened one hotel "near Atlantic City, New Jersey, so that blacks could access the beach."

Father Divine and the Peace Mission, became the largest property owners in Harlem at one point in time. The movement also opened several budget enterprises, including restaurants and clothing shops, that sold cheaply by cutting overheads. These proved very successful in the depression. Economical, cash-only businesses were part of Father Divine's doctrine.

By 1934, branches had opened in Los Angeles and Seattle, and gatherings occurred in France, Switzerland, Canada, and Australia, but the membership totals were drastically overstated in the press. Time magazine estimated nearly 2 million followers, but the true figure of adherents was probably a few tens of thousands and a larger body of sympathizers who attended his gatherings.

Nonetheless, Father Divine was increasingly called upon to offer political endorsements, which he initially did not. For example, New York City mayoral candidates John P. O'Brien and Fiorello H. LaGuardia each sought his endorsement in 1933, but Father Divine was apparently uninterested.

An odd alliance between Father Divine and the Communist Party of America began in early 1934. Although Father Divine was outspokenly capitalist, he was impressed with the party's commitment to civil rights. The party relished the endorsement, but contemporary FBI records indicate some critics of the perceived huckster were expelled from the party for protesting the alliance.

In spite of this alliance, the movement was largely apolitical until the Harlem Riot of 1935. Based on a rumor of police killing a black teenager, it left four dead and caused over $1 million in property damage in Father Divine's neighborhood. Father Divine's outrage at this and other racial injustices fueled a keener interest in politics. In January 1939, the movement organized the first-ever "Divine Righteous Government Convention", which crafted political platforms incorporating the Doctrine of Father Divine. Among other things, the delegates opposed school segregation and many of Franklin Delano Roosevelt's social programs, which they interpreted as "handouts".

At the zenith of Father Divine's influence, several misfortunes struck the movement. 

On December 16, John Hunt, a white millionaire and disciple from California calling himself John the Revelator, met the Jewett family of Denver, Colorado. He kidnapped their 17-year-old daughter Delight and took her back to California without her parents' consent. Renaming her "Virgin Mary", John the Revelator began sexual relations with her. He announced that she would give birth to a "New Redeemer" by "immaculate conception" in Hawaii.

Father Divine summoned Hunt to New York, separated the couple and chastised his eccentric follower. The Jewetts, finding their daughter apparently brainwashed into believing she was literally the Virgin Mary, demanded compensation. After the movement's attorneys conducted an internal investigation, they refused. Outraged, the Jewetts offered their story to William Randolph Hearst's New York Evening Journal, an established critic of the movement.

After a manhunt and trial, John Hunt was sentenced to three years and adopted a new name, the "Prodigal Son". Father Divine publicly endorsed the conviction of John the Revelator, contrary to some expectations (some followers expected him to once again "smite" the judge). The scandal brought bad publicity to Father Divine. News coverage implied his followers were gullible and dangerous.

In March 1937, Penninah fell ill in Kingston, New York. Father Divine rarely comforted her on what was widely believed to be her deathbed. He kept running the church, only visiting her once in Kingston, again causing bad publicity. Penninah, however, claimed that she was not seriously ill or in pain.

On April 20, 1937, a violent outburst occurred in a meeting when two men tried to deliver Father Divine a summons. One of the men, Harry Green, was stabbed as Father Divine fled. Father Divine went into hiding to evade authorities.

During this time, one of Father Divine's most prominent followers, called Faithful Mary, defected and took control of a large commune, which was technically in her name. Of the Father she said, "he's just a damned man." She furthermore alleged that he defrauded his followers to maintain a rich lifestyle for himself. Faithful Mary also made a number of sexual allegations, including a charge that Father Divine coerced women to have sex with key disciples.

In early May 1937, Father Divine was located and extradited from Connecticut and faced criminal charges in New York. That summer, Hearst's Metronone newsreel distributed mocking footage of Father Divine's followers singing outside police headquarters, "Glory, glory, hallelujah! Our God is in our land!"

Later in May 1937, an ex-follower called Verinda Brown filed a lawsuit for $4,476 against Father Divine. The Browns had entrusted their savings with Father Divine in Sayville back in 1931. They left the movement in 1935 wishing to live as husband and wife again, but were unable to get their money back. In light of their evidence and testimony from Faithful Mary and others critical of the movement, the court ordered repayment of the money. However, this opened up an enormous potential liability from all ex-devotees, so Father Divine resisted and appealed the judgment.

In 1938, Father Divine was cleared of criminal charges and Mother Divine recovered. Faithful Mary, impoverished and broken, returned to the movement. Father Divine made her grovel for forgiveness, which she did. By the late 1930s, the movement stabilized, although it had clearly passed its zenith.

Father Divine's political focus on anti-lynching measures became more resolved. By 1940, his followers had gathered 250,000 signatures in favor of an anti-lynching bill he wrote. However, passage of such statutes came slowly in New York and elsewhere.

The Verinda Brown lawsuit against Father dragged on and was sustained on appeal. In July 1942, he was ordered to pay Brown or face contempt of court. Instead, Father Divine fled the state and re-established his headquarters in Philadelphia, Pennsylvania. He still visited New York, however. State law forbade serving subpoenas in New York on Sunday, so he often spoke on the Sabbath day in Harlem, the Promised Land (his commune in Kingston, New York), and Sayville, New York

1942–1965: Pennsylvania
After moving to Philadelphia, Father Divine's wife Penninah died. The exact date is not known, because Father Divine never talked about it or even acknowledged her death. However, it occurred sometime in 1943, and biographers believe Penninah's death rattled Father Divine, making him aware of his own mortality. It became obvious to Father Divine and his followers that his doctrine might not make one immortal as he asserted, at least not in the flesh.

In 1944, singer/songwriter Johnny Mercer came to hear of one of Divine's sermons. The subject was "You got to accentuate the positive and eliminate the negative". Mercer said, "Wow, that's a colorful phrase!" He went back to Hollywood and got together with songwriter Harold Arlen ("Over the Rainbow"), and together they wrote "Ac-Cent-Tchu-Ate the Positive", which was recorded by Mercer and the Pied Pipers in 1945. It was recorded by Bing Crosby with the Andrews Sisters that same year.

After his first wife died, Father Divine married a white Canadian woman named Edna Rose Ritchings in Washington, D.C. on April 29, 1946. The ceremony was kept secret even from most members until Ritching's visa expired. Critics of the movement believed that Father Divine's seemingly scandalous marriage to 21-year-old Ritchings would destroy the movement. Instead, most followers rejoiced, and the marriage date became a celebrated anniversary in the movement. To prove that he and Ritchings adhered to his doctrine on sexual abstinence, Father Divine assigned a black female follower to be her constant companion.

He claimed that Ritchings, later called "Mother S. A. Divine", was the reincarnation of Penninah. Reincarnation was not previously part of Father Divine's doctrine and did not become a fixture of his theology. Followers believed that Penninah was an exceptional case and viewed her "return" as a miracle.

Going into the 1950s, the press rarely covered Father Divine, and when it did, it was no longer as a menace, but as an amusing relic. For example, light-hearted stories ran when Father Divine announced Philadelphia was capital of the world and when he claimed to inspire invention of the hydrogen bomb. Father Divine's predominantly lower-class following ebbed as the economy swelled.

In 1953, follower John Devoute gave Father Divine Woodmont, a 72-acre (0.3 km2) hilltop estate in Gladwyne, Pennsylvania. This French Gothic manor served as his home and primary site of his increasingly infrequent banquets until his death in 1965.

As his health declined, he continued to petition for civil rights. In 1951, he advocated reparations to be paid to the descendants of slaves. He also argued in favor of integrated neighborhoods. However, he did not participate in the burgeoning American civil rights movement because of his poor health and especially his dislike of the use of racial labels, denying he was black.

On September 10, 1965, Father Divine died of natural causes at his Woodmont estate. His widow and remaining followers insist his spirit is still alive and always refer to Father Divine in the present tense. Believers keep the furnishings of Father Divine's personal rooms at Woodmont just as they were as a shrine to his life.

Father Divine's widow Edna Rose Ritchings became the spiritual leader of the movement. In 1972, she fought an attempt by Jim Jones to take over the movement's dwindling devotees. Jones based some of his doctrines on the International Peace Mission movement and claimed to be the reincarnation of Father Divine. Although a few members of the Mission joined the Peoples Temple after Jones made his play for leadership of the movement, the power push was, in terms of its ultimate objective, a failure.

That Jones was 34 years old at the time of Father Divine's death made his claims of being a new incarnation rather hard to sustain – Jones claimed Divine's spirit had entered his body upon the passing of the elder man – and Ritchings was left unimpressed by Jones' impassioned rhetoric. Jones' custom of tape-recording all his sermons was copied from Divine, who "spoke" to his followers via archived sermon tapes once ill health forced him to cease speaking at meetings.

Physical characteristics and preaching style
Father Divine was a slight, black man at a diminutive . Through most of his life, he maintained a fastidious appearance and a neat mustache that he kept well groomed, his hair was invariably neatly combed, and since his days in Sayville, New York, he almost always wore a suit in public.

Father Divine was said to be very charismatic. His sermons were emotionally moving and freely associated between topics. His speech was often peppered with words of his own invention like "physicalating" and "tangiblated". An attendee at a Harlem "kingdoms" meeting in the 1930s recalled that he rhythmically intoned "Tens, hundreds, thousands, ten thousands, hundred thousands, millions. Tens, hundreds, ... millions." Although this seemed nonsense to the visitor, he reported that at the end the true believers chanted, "Yes, he's God. Yes he's God."

Father Divine ended every sermon or article with the following statement, "Sincerely wishing that you and those with whom you are concerned might be even as I AM for I AM well, healthy, joyful, peaceful, lively, loving, successful, prosperous and happy in spirit, body and mind and in every organ, muscle, sinew, joint, limb, vein and bone and even in every atom, fibre and cell of MY bodily form."

Other eccentricities were drawn from his doctrine. For example, nearly every sermon began with the greeting and exhortation "Peace!" Father Divine believed that peace should replace hello.

Doctrine

Father Divine preached of his divinity even before he was known as "Father Divine" in the late 1910s. His doctrine taught that his life fulfilled all biblical prophecies about the second coming, regarding himself as Jesus Christ reborn. Father Divine also lectured that Christ existed in "every joint" of his follower's bodies, and that he was "God's light" incarnated in order to show people how to establish heaven on earth and to show them the way to eternal life. For example:

Father Divine and his followers capitalized pronouns referring to him, much like "LORD" translated from the tetragrammaton is capitalized in the English Bible.

Father Divine's definition of God became quite celebrated at the time because of its unusual use of language: "God is not only personified and materialized. He is repersonified and rematerialized. He rematerialized and He rematerialates. He rematerialates and He is rematerializatable. He repersonificates and He repersonifitizes."

Positive thought 
Father Divine can be considered part of the New Thought movement; indeed, many of his white followers came from this tradition.

Welfare 
Father Divine was particularly concerned with the downtrodden of society, including but not limited to Blacks. He was opposed to people accepting welfare. He believed in capitalism, and "In his opinion, capitalism was not at fault; the individual was to blame for the depression." He thought Americans could make it better if they had positive thoughts and channeled God's spirit.

Race 
Scholars disagree about whether Father Divine, an African American, was a civil rights activist, but he certainly advocated some progressive changes to race relations. For example, because he believed that every human was accorded equal rights, he believed that all members of lynch mobs ought to be tried and convicted as murderers. Father Divine's anti-lynching campaigns resonated in the black ghettos where his congregations lived, and he got over a quarter million people to sign his anti-lynching proposals.

Patriotism 
Father Divine advocated that followers think of themselves as simply Americans. He believed that America was the birthplace of the "Kingdom of God", which would ultimately encompass truths of all religious principles, promoting equality and brotherhood. The movement was supportive of the United States Declaration of Independence, the United States Constitution and particularly the Bill of Rights as inspired documents, believing that they outlined an ideal life.

Communal living 
Toward this life, followers of Father Divine owned and managed property collectively. The movement strove to alleviate poverty by feeding the poor and through education in written English, which the movement believed was the "universal language".

Chastity 
Father Divine established an "International Modesty Code" which forbids smoking, drinking, and using profanity. Additionally, it forbade tipping, using bribes, receiving presents, and "undue mixing of the sexes" as well as women wearing slacks or short skirts and men wearing short sleeves.

Although Father Divine was married, the movement discouraged marriage, along with any excessive mingling of the sexes. In the "Heavens" and other living spaces the movement maintained, separate areas existed for men and women.

Thrift and business practices 
Father Divine advocated a number of economic practices, which his followers abided by. He opposed life insurance (which converts were to cancel), welfare, social security, and credit. Thus, the movement advocated economic self-sufficiency. His insistence that his followers refuse welfare not related to employment was estimated to have saved New York City $2 million during the Depression.

Business owners in the movement named their ventures to show affiliation with Father Divine, and obeyed all of these practices. They dealt only in cash, refusing credit in any of its forms. Each was to sell below competitor's prices while refusing any sorts of tips or gratuities. Finally, they refrained from trade in alcohol or tobacco.

Legacy

Civil rights
Some biographers, such as Robert Weisbrot, speculate that Father Divine was a forerunner to the civil rights movement during the 1950s and 1960s, heavily influenced by his upbringing in the segregated South. Others, such as Jill Watts, reject not only this characterization, but also the theory that Father Divine grew up in the Deep South. Watts asserts that Rockville was less oppressive than the South or even Baltimore, Maryland, and believes his civil rights positions are unintelligible without evaluating them in the context of the Doctrine of Father Divine.

Religious
Edna Rose Ritchings (Mother Divine) conducted services for the old and dwindling congregation until her death. The movement owns several properties, such as Father Divine's Gladwyne estate Woodmont, his former home in Sayville, New York, and the Circle Mission Church on Broad Street in Philadelphia, which also houses the movement's library.

Chapters exist in Pennsylvania and possibly elsewhere, but the movement is not centralized and exists through a number of interrelated groups.

In 2004, Gastronomica published an article about Mother S.A. Divine and the movement's feasts.

In 2000, the Divine Lorraine Hotel near Temple University on North Broad Street was sold by the international Peace Mission movement. It was a budget hotel with separate floors for men and women in accord with Father Divine's teachings. The Divine Tracy Hotel in West Philadelphia was sold in 2006.

See also

 List of people who have been considered deities
 God complex

References

Further reading
 God Comes to America: Father Divine and the Peace Mission Movement, Kenneth E. Burnham, Boston: Lambeth Press, 1979 
 Father Divine and the Struggle for Racial Equality, Robert Weisbrot, Urbana: University of Illinois Press, 1983 
 Father Divine, Holy Husband, Sara Harris, Garden City, N. Y.: Doubleday, 1953
 Promised Land: Father Divine's Interracial Communities in Ulster County, New York, Carleton Mabee, Fleischmanns: Purple Mountain Press, 2008 
 "Who Is This King of Glory?", St. Clair McKelway and A.J. Liebling, New Yorker, June 1936, reprinted (pp. 80–122) in Reporting at Wit's End: Tales from the New Yorker, St. Clair McKelway, Bloomsbury USA, 2010,

External links
 www.peacemission.info website about Father Divine and his International Peace Mission movement
 
 The Father Divine Project — A Database Documentary
 Ronald M. White, New Thought Influences on Father Divine (Masters Thesis, Miami University, Oxford, Ohio, 1980). Abstract
 International Peace Mission Movement and Father Divine, Encyclopedia of Greater Philadelphia
 International Peace Mission movement Homepage 
 Father Divine and the International Peace Mission Documentary website
 Father Divine Papers at Stuart A. Rose Manuscript, Archives, and Rare Book Library

1870s births
1965 deaths

Year of birth uncertain
Activists from Georgia (U.S. state)
African-American religious leaders
American anti-lynching activists
American reparationists
Cult leaders
Deified people
Founders of new religious movements
International Peace Mission movement
People from Lowndes County, Georgia
Self-declared messiahs
20th-century African-American people